Gwyn Avenue–Bridge Street Historic District is a national historic district located at Elkin, Surry County, North Carolina. The district encompasses 124 contributing buildings and 1 contributing site in a predominantly residential section of Elkin.  They were primarily built between about 1891 and 1955 and include notable examples of Queen Anne, Colonial Revival, and Bungalow / American Craftsman architecture. Notable buildings include the Elkin Presbyterian Church (1937, 1944, 1950, 1955, 1961), First Baptist Church (1955, 1968), Alexander Martin Smith House (1893–1897) designed by George Franklin Barber, the Gwyn-Chatham-Gwyn House (c. 1872, 1911, 1936), Richard Gwyn Smith House (c. 1918), and Mason Lillard House (c. 1910).

It was added to the National Register of Historic Places in 2007.

References

Historic districts on the National Register of Historic Places in North Carolina
Queen Anne architecture in North Carolina
Colonial Revival architecture in North Carolina
Buildings and structures in Surry County, North Carolina
National Register of Historic Places in Surry County, North Carolina
Gilded Age mansions